2017 in Bellator MMA was the tenth year in the history of Bellator MMA, a mixed martial arts promotion based in the United States. Bellator held 26 events in 2017.

Background
This year, Bellator announced their first MMA event to be held in New York: Bellator NYC. The event would also mark the Bellator debuts of former UFC commentator Mike Goldberg, calling his first card on Spike TV since 2011 (which was the televised portion of Bellator NYC, referred to as Bellator 180), and former Strikeforce commentator Mauro Ranallo.

Bellator 170

Bellator 170: Ortiz vs. Sonnen  took place on January 21, 2017, at The Forum in Inglewood, California. The event aired live in prime time on Spike TV, drawing 1.4 million viewers.

Background

On October 18, 2016, it was announced that former UFC Light Heavyweight Champion Tito Ortiz and UFC veteran Chael Sonnen would headline this event. Sonnen owns career wins over the likes of Yushin Okami, Nate Marquardt, Brian Stann, former UFC Light Heavyweight Champion Maurício Rua and former UFC Middleweight Champion Michael Bisping. Ortiz is a UFC Hall of Famer and one of the most decorated champions in UFC history. "The Huntington Beach Bad Boy" signed with Bellator in 2013 and has gone 2–1 with the promotion. He has wins over the likes of Alexander Shlemenko, Stephan Bonnar, Wanderlei Silva, Ken Shamrock and Forrest Griffin.

A women's bout between Rebecca Ruth and Colleen Schneider was initially announced for this card. However, the bout never came to fruition for undisclosed reasons and Ruth was replaced by Chrissie Daniels

Results

Bellator 171

Bellator 171: Guillard vs. Njokuani was held on January 27, 2017, at the Kansas Star Casino in Mulvane, Kansas. The event aired live in prime time on Spike TV.
 
Background

The event was headlined by catchweight at 179 pounds bout between UFC veteran Melvin Guillard and Chidi Njokuani.

The co-main event featured a lightweight bout between local favorite David Rickels and Aaron Derrow.

Additionally, prospects and former collegiate heavyweight wrestling stars Jarod Trice and Tyrell Fortune were featured on the undercard. Trice, a three-time All-American wrestler at Central Michigan University, faced Kevin Woltkamp. Fortune, a former NCAA Division 2 champion, faced Will Johnson.

Results

Bellator 172

Bellator 172: Thomson vs. Pitbull aired on Saturday, February 18, 2017, at the SAP Center in San Jose, California. The event aired live in prime time on Spike TV.

Background 

The event was scheduled to be headlined by heavyweight legend Fedor Emelianenko against former UFC veteran Matt Mitrione. Emelianenko retired in 2012, but ultimately returned to the sport in 2015. This was to be Emelianenko's first fight in the U.S. since 2011. Mitrione, a 38-year-old former NFL player has scored back-to-back knockout victories since joining Bellator over Carl Seumanutafa and Oli Thompson. Hours before the event, the fight was cancelled due to Mitrione becoming ill. As a result, Josh Thomson vs. Patricky Pitbull was moved up to the main event.

Results

Bellator 173

Bellator 173: McGeary vs. McDermott was held on February 24, 2017, at the SSE Arena in Belfast, Northern Ireland. The event aired live in prime time on Spike TV. 
 
Background

The event was originally scheduled to be headlined by a bout between Liam McGeary and Chris Fields. However, on February 20, it was announced that Fields had to withdraw from the match due to injury. The initial replacement for Fields was announced as Bellator newcomer Vladimir Filipovic. However, Filipovic also was pulled from the bout due to visa issues. McGeary eventually faced Bellator newcomer Brett McDermott.

The event was a dual promotion event as Bellator's card was co-promoted with BAMMA 28.

Results

Bellator 174

Bellator 174: Coenen vs. Budd was held on March 3, 2017, at the WinStar World Casino in Thackerville, Oklahoma. The event aired live in prime time on Spike TV.
 
Background

The main event featured Marloes Coenen versus Julia Budd for the inaugural Bellator women's featherweight title. This was the first time a woman's bout has headlined a Bellator card.

Kendall Grove was originally scheduled to face Chris Honeycutt at this event. However, Honeycutt was removed from the bout on February 28 and replaced by three-time UFC veteran and Bellator newcomer Mike Rhodes. Rhodes then failed to make weight and the fight was cancelled.

Joe Taimanglo was scheduled to face Steve Garcia on this card. However, the fight was removed from the card after Taimanglo missed weight.

Results

Bellator 175

Bellator 175: Rampage vs. King Mo 2 was held on March 31, 2017, at the Allstate Arena in Rosemont, Illinois. The event aired live in prime time on Spike TV.

Background

The event was headlined by Heavyweight bout between former UFC Light Heavyweight Champion Quinton Jackson against former Strikeforce Light Heavyweight Champion Muhammed Lawal.

At the weigh ins, Emmanuel Sanchez missed the 146-pound featherweight limit, coming in at 149.5 pounds. The fight was changed to a catchweight.

Results

Bellator 176

Bellator 176: Carvalho vs. Manhoef 2 took place on April 8, 2017, at the Pala Alpitour in Torino, Italy. The event aired on Spike TV.

Background

A Middleweight world title fight rematch pitting Rafael Carvalho against Melvin Manhoef served as the main event of Bellator 176.

The event was announced by the company in February 2017.  It was the second time Bellator MMA held an event at the Pala Alpitour in Torino, Italy.  Like the previous card, this event featured both MMA and kickboxing bouts.

Results

Bellator 177

Bellator 177: Dantas vs. Higo took place on April 14, 2017, at Budapest Sports Arena in Budapest, Hungary . The event aired on Spike TV.

Background

This event marked Bellator's second event in Hungary. The event featured both MMA and kickboxing bouts.

The main event was originally scheduled to feature Eduardo Dantas against Darrion Caldwell, but Caldwell withdrew due to injury. Leandro Higo stepped in as a replacement. Due to the short notice, the fight was changed from a Bantamweight title bout to a non-title contest at a catchweight of 139 pounds.

Bellator Kickboxing 6 was headlined by a Welterweight world title rematch featuring Zoltán Laszák against Karim Ghajji. Additionally, two-time Glory Featherweight Champion Gabriel Varga made his Bellator Kickboxing debut.

Results

Bellator 178

Bellator 178: Straus vs. Pitbull 4 took place on April 21, 2017, at Mohegan Sun Arena in Uncasville, Connecticut . The event aired live on Spike TV.

Background

Bellator returned to Mohegan Sun with a Featherweight world title fight pitting Daniel Straus against Patricio "Pitbull" Freire as the main event of Bellator 178.  Straus and Freire have fought three times before; Freire won one by submission and once by decision, while Straus most recently won by decision.

A middleweight bout between Ed Ruth and Aaron Goodwine was originally scheduled for this card, but failed to materialize. Ruth instead faced David Mundell.

Results

Bellator 179

Bellator 179: MacDonald vs. Daley took place on May 19, 2017, at the SSE Arena in London, England. The event aired on Spike TV.

Background

Bellator returned to London with a welterweight fight pitting Paul Daley against Rory MacDonald serving as the main event of Bellator 179.

Stav Economou was originally scheduled to face Karl Etherington in heavyweight bout. However, the bout was cancelled and Economous faced Dan Konecke.

Neil Grove and Łukasz Parobiec were expected to fight in a Heavyweight bout. However, the fight was cancelled for undisclosed reasons.

Michael Page was scheduled to face Derek Anderson as the co-main event. However, the fight was removed from the card after Page suffered a knee injury and neck injury.

Results

Bellator Monster Energy Fight Series: Charlotte

Bellator Monster Energy Fight Series: Charlotte took place on May 20, 2017, at the Charlotte Motor Speedway in Concord, North Carolina

Background

On May 1, 2017, Bellator announced a special four-fight card that took place at the Monster Energy NASCAR All-Star Race XXXIII. The goal of the event was to scout new talent for a prospective contract. Unlike all previous Bellator events, this event was not televised, as this event took place at a NASCAR race, where Fox Sports, which holds rights to a rival MMA promotion, holds video rights for events at the Charlotte Motor Speedway during the event.

Results

Bellator NYC/Bellator 180

Bellator NYC: Sonnen vs. Silva and Bellator 180 took place on June 24, 2017, at Madison Square Garden in New York City. The event aired both Spike TV and on PPV.

Background

A grudge match between rivals Chael Sonnen and Wanderlei Silva served as the main event.

The co-main event was a heavyweight bout between Fedor Emelianenko vs. Matt Mitrione. The pairing were supposed to meet at Bellator 172 but Mitrione had to be hospitalized due to kidney stones.

Debuting former UFC fighter Ryan Bader was initially scheduled to face Muhammed Lawal on this card. However, Lawal pulled out of the fight due to an injury and Bader instead faced Light Heavyweight champion Phil Davis in a rematch. Bader and Davis first met at UFC on Fox: Gustafsson vs. Johnson on January 24, 2015, with Bader winning by split decision.

A fight between Keri Anne Melendez and Sadee Monseratte Williams was scheduled but cancelled after Melendez pulled out due to injury.

The PPV portion of the MSG card was referred to as Bellator NYC. The undercard, airing on Spike, was Bellator 180.

Results

Bellator 181

Bellator 181: Girtz vs. Campos 3 took place on July 14, 2017, at the WinStar World Casino in Thackerville, Oklahoma. The event aired live in prime time on Spike TV.
 
Background

The main event featured Brandon Girtz against Derek Campos in a rubber match. Campos won the pair's initial meeting in June 2013 at Bellator 96 by unanimous decision. Girtz avenged the loss in November 2015 at Bellator 146, where he won by knockout in the first round.

Former UFC fighter Valérie Létourneau was expected to make her Bellator debut on this card against Emily Ducote. However, on July 10, Létourneau withdrew from the bout due to injury and was replaced by Jessica Middleton.

Results

Bellator Monster Energy Fight Series: Bristol

Bellator Monster Energy Fight Series: Bristol was the second installment of the series and took place on August 19, 2017, at the Bristol Motor Speedway, in Bristol, Tennessee.  Again, the fights were not televised because of television conflicts with NASCAR's rights holder (NBC, which airs the Professional Fighters League, aired a PFL contest June 30).

Results

Bellator 182

Bellator 182: Koreshkov vs. Njokuani took place on August 25, 2017, at the Turning Stone Resort & Casino in Verona, New York. The event aired live in prime time on Spike TV.
 
Background

The main event featured former Bellator Welterweight Champion Andrey Koreshkov versus Chidi Njokuani. It was originally scheduled as a welterweight bout, but Njokuani missed weight so the bout was contested at a catchweight of 175 pounds.

The co-main event of Brennan Ward against Fernando Gonzalez was set to be a catchweight bout of 178 pounds. However, Gonzalez weighed in at 180 pounds.

Gabby Holloway was originally scheduled to face Talita Nogueira on this card. However, on August 1, Holloway withdrew from the bout and was replaced by Amanda Bell.

Results

Bellator 183

Bellator 183: Henderson vs. Pitbull took place on September 23, 2017, at the SAP Center in San Jose, California. The event aired live in prime time on Spike TV.

Background

The main event featured a Lightweight bout between Benson Henderson and Patricky Freire.

Also occurring on the show was Bellator Kickboxing 7 headlined by featherweight title bout between Kevin Ross and Domenico Lomurno.

Results

Bellator 184

Bellator 184: Dantas vs. Caldwell took place on October 6, 2017, at the WinStar World Casino in Thackerville, Oklahoma. The event aired live in prime time on Spike TV. 
 
Results

Bellator Monster Energy Fight Series: Talladega

Bellator Monster Energy Fight Series: Talladega was the third installment of the series held on October 13, 2017, at the Talladega Superspeedway, in Lincoln, Alabama.  Again, the fights were not televised because of television conflicts with NASCAR's rights holder (NBC, which airs the Professional Fighters League, aired a PFL contest June 30 during the Coca-Cola Firecracker 250 at Daytona).

Results

Bellator 185

Bellator 185: Mousasi vs. Shlemenko took place on October 20, 2017, at Mohegan Sun Arena in Uncasville, Connecticut. The event aired live on Spike TV.

Background

Bellator 185 marked the debut of heralded middleweight fighter Gegard Mousasi. Having competed for the UFC for the last four years, Mousasi opted to sign with Bellator MMA when his contract came up.

Muhammed Lawal was scheduled to face Liam McGeary in a Light Heavyweight bout in the co-main event. However, on October 2, he pulled out of the fight due to an undisclosed injury. He was replaced by Bubba McDaniel. The following week, McGeary pulled out of the fight due to a thumb injury.

Brennan Ward was scheduled to face David Rickels in a welterweight bout on the main card. However, on October 16, Ward was removed from the card due to injury and Rickels was pulled from the card as a result.

Javier Torres was scheduled to face Neiman Gracie on this card, but pulled out due to injury. He was replaced with welterweight Zak Bucia.

Results

Bellator 186

Bellator 186: Bader vs. Vassell  took place on November 3, 2017, at the Bryce Jordan Center in University Park, Pennsylvania. The event aired live in prime time on Spike TV. 
 
Background

In the Bellator 186 main event Ryan Bader made the first defense of his Light Heavyweight title against Linton Vassell .

The co-main event featured Ilima-Lei Macfarlane against Emily Ducote for the inaugural Bellator Women's Flyweight title.

Results

Bellator 187

Bellator 187: McKee vs. Moore  took place on November 10, 2017, at the 3Arena in Dublin, Ireland. The event aired live in prime time on Spike TV. 
 
Background

James Gallagher was expected to main event Bellator 187 against Jeremiah Labiano; however, on October 11, Gallagher withdrew from the bout due to injury. Labiano was moved to face Noad Lahat at Bellator 188 on November 16.

A featherweight match-up between A.J. McKee and Brian Moore served as the new main event.

The event was a co-promotion between Bellator MMA and BAMMA with BAMMA 32 taking place the same night.

Results

Bellator 188

Bellator 188: Lahat vs. Labiano took place on November 16, 2017, at the Menora Mivtachim Arena in Tel Aviv, Israel. The event aired on Spike TV.

Background

The card was originally headlined by a rematch between champion Patrício Freire and Daniel Weichel for the Bellator Featherweight Championship. The pair previously met in June 2015 at Bellator 138 with Freire winning by knockout. On November 12, it was announced Freire had to withdraw due to a knee injury.

The main event instead featured a match between Noad Lahat and Jeremiah Labiano. 
 
The card also featured Dutch kickboxing standout Denise Kielholtz's second MMA fight.

Results

Bellator: Monster Energy Fight Series: Homestead

Bellator: Monster Energy Fight Series: Homestead was the fourth installment of the series held on November 19, 2017, at the Homestead-Miami Speedway, in Homestead, Florida.  Again, the fights were not televised because of television conflicts with NASCAR's rights holder (NBC, which airs the Professional Fighters League, aired a PFL contest June 30 during the Coca-Cola Firecracker 250 at Daytona).

Results

Bellator 189

Bellator 189: Budd vs. Blencowe 2  took place December 1, 2017 at the WinStar World Casino in Thackerville, Oklahoma. The event aired live in prime time on Spike TV. 
 
Background

In the Bellator 189 main event, women's featherweight champion Julia Budd faced Arlene Blencowe in a rematch. The pair originally fought at Bellator 162 with Budd winning via majority decision.

The co-main event was a middleweight bout between Rafael Lovato Jr. and Chris Honeycutt.

Results

Bellator 190

Bellator 190: Carvalho vs. Sakara took place on December 9, 2017, at the Nelson Mandela Forum in Florence, Italy. The event aired on Spike TV.

Background

A Middleweight world title fight match pitting Rafael Carvalho against Alessio Sakara will served as the main event of Bellator 190.

Occurring also on this card is Bellator Kickboxing 8 headlined by Lightweight title bout pitting Giorgio Petrosyan against Youdwicha.

Results

Bellator 191

Bellator 191: McDonald vs. Ligier  took place on December 15, 2017, at the Metro Radio Arena in Newcastle, England. The event aired on tape delay in prime time on Spike TV. 
 
Background

The main event featured the Bellator debut of former World Extreme Cagefighting and Ultimate Fighting Championship bantamweight contender Michael McDonald.

The event was a co-promotion between Bellator MMA and BAMMA 33.

Results

References

External links
Bellator

2017 in mixed martial arts
Bellator MMA events